PTX, Vol. IV: Classics is the fifth extended play album by the a cappella group Pentatonix. It was released by RCA Records on April 7, 2017, and is their first EP since 2014's PTX, Vol. III. It is their final release with original member Avi Kaplan, who left the group later that year.

Their second work after PTXmas to not feature any original material, the album marks a departure from the group's typical sound, which mostly consists of either modern pop songs or Christmas music, choosing instead to focus on standards of rock, blues, country, and older pop music.

"Jolene", featuring the original artist, Dolly Parton, earned her and Pentatonix a Grammy Award for Best Country Duo/Group Performance.

Critical reception
The group's cover of "Jolene", originally released as a single and later included in the EP, was particularly praised. Julia Brucculieri of The Huffington Post called the version "a hauntingly beautiful a cappella update" Markos Papadatos of Digital Journal called it a "stellar version", stating that "Pentatonix proves yet again that they can do no wrong with anything they sing or cover. The addition of Dolly Parton helps elevate 'Jolene' to a higher level, and they prove that it is possible for heaven to be a place on earth. Their a cappella rendition earns five out of five stars." Stefan Kyriazis of the Daily Express called it a "remarkable new version of the old standard. 'Jolene' was released way back in 1973 but has never sounded fresher."

Sara Vallone of the Independent Journal Review stated that "Pentatonix just did justice to Dolly Parton's 'Jolene'", and that "Parton is proving once again just how timeless she truly is". The cover eventually won the Grammy Award for Best Country Duo/Group Performance. Parton had been nominated for Best Female Country Vocal Performance twice for the song, first for its 1973 original release and then in 1976 for a live version; this resulted in the song earning her a Grammy 44 years after its original release.

In an online review, Brandy McDonnell of The Oklahoman called the group's cover of "Bohemian Rhapsody" "an incredible rendition [...] that highlights the quintet's sterling harmonies and vocal effects."

Commercial performance
PTX, Vol. IV: Classics debuted at number four on the Billboard 200 with 54,000 album-equivalent units, of which 50,000 were pure album sales.

Track listing

Personnel
Pentatonix
 Scott Hoying – baritone, lead and backing vocals
 Mitch Grassi – tenor lead and backing vocals
 Kirstin Maldonado – alto lead and backing vocals
 Avi Kaplan – vocal bass, bass lead and backing vocals
 Kevin Olusola – beatboxing, backing vocals, lead vocals on "Imagine", vocal flugelhorn on "Boogie Woogie Bugle Boy"

Additional personnel
 Pentatonix, Ben Bram – production, arranger, engineer
 Dolly Parton – lead vocals on "Jolene"
 Andrew Kesler – arranger
 Ed Boyer – mixing
Bill Hare – mastering

Charts

References

2017 EPs
A cappella albums
Covers albums
Pentatonix EPs
RCA Records EPs
Sequel albums